VIVES University of Applied Sciences is a University College in West Flanders. The name refers to the Spanish-Brussian humanist Juan Luis Vives. VIVES is the result of a merger between KATHO and KHBO in 2013.

Founding  
The university college was created by the fusion of the Katholieke Hogeschool Zuid-West-Vlaanderen and the Katholieke Hogeschool Brugge-Oostende. KATHO and KHBO signed a declaration of intent for cooperation on 23 June 2010. The fusion and the name were announced on 21 December 2012 and became effective in September 2013. At the same time, the university courses were split off into , a new department of KU Leuven.

With more than 16,000 students, VIVES is one of the largest university colleges in Flanders, together with HoGent (15,000), Arteveldehogeschool (15,000) and UCLL (14,500).

Campuses

VIVES South
 Courtrai (HQ)
 Roeselare
 Tielt (Closed mid-2019)
 Torhout

VIVES North
 Bruges (campus Xaverianenstraat and campus Bruges Station)
 Ostend (campus Ostend Station and campus VLOC)

References

External links 

 
 Website of the Association K.U.Leuven

Catholic universities and colleges in Belgium
Education in Bruges
Ostend
Buildings and structures in West Flanders
Colleges in Belgium
Educational institutions established in 2013
Buildings and structures in Kortrijk
Roeselare
Torhout
Universities and colleges formed by merger in Belgium
2013 establishments in Belgium